Hind Mahila also called Woman's Challenge is a 1936 Hindi social film directed by Premankur Atorthy. It was produced by Kolhapur Cinetone.  Premankur Atorthy Moved from New Theatres and worked for Kohlapur Cinetone making Bhikharan and Hind Mahila for them before going to Imperial Film Company. The music direction was by H. C. Bali. The cast included Rattan Bai, Shahu Modak, Master Vithal, and Hafisji.

Cast 
Rattan Bai
Shahu Modak
Master Vithal
Hafisji
Raja Pandit
Sudhabala

Songs

"Basant Aayi Hai Muskarati"
"Aaj Bana Madak Sansar"
"Acharya Jo Sab Deshon Ka Raha"
"Bana De Beena Hai Bhagwan"
"Ise Hi kehte Hain Prem"
"Bhar Bhar Jaam Pila De Saaki"
"Kahin Karta Hoon Maat Kahin Khaata Hoon Laat"
"Saqi Mai e Gulgoo Ki Jab Jalwagiri Dekhi"
"Zahid Ko Jaam Door Se Dikha Le Ke Pi Gaya"
"Magan Aaj Hui Tan Man Se"
"Samay Akarath Mat Kho Pyaare"

References

External links

1936 films
1930s Hindi-language films
Films directed by Premankur Atorthy
Indian black-and-white films